Channa (Sindhi: چنا, Urdu: چنہ ) also spelled as Chana, is one of the ancient Sindhi tribes in Sindh, Pakistan.

History and origin

After the accession of Chach of Alor, all the four outlying provinces which Hieun Tsang saw as parts of Sind declared independence. Since he saw a Sudra ruling Sind, Chach may have ascended the throne after 640 A.D. and the four provinces rebelled on his usurpation. Among the tribes which raised this rebellion, Chachnama mentions the Sama, Sahita, Channa, Lohana and Jats. It seems that the rebellion was subdued by winning over Buddhist priests (Shamanis), as Arabs saw most of forts held by them in 711 CE. The powerful governor of Bahmanabad, Agham Lohana, was defeated and killed. The Jat, the Lohana, the Sama, Sahita (plural of Sahto) and the Channa tribes, who were mainly Buddhists, refused to acknowledge the over lordship of the Hindu Raja.

References

Sindhi tribes
Sindhi-language surnames
Pakistani names